Essex is a city in Page County, Iowa, United States. The population was 722 in the 2020 census, a decline from the 884 population in 2000.

History
Essex was platted in 1870. The Chicago, Burlington and Quincy Railroad arrived in Essex in 1871.

Geography
Essex is located at  (40.833016, -95.305208) near the East Nishnabotna River.

Demographics

2010 census
As of the census of 2010, there were 798 people, 333 households, and 228 families living in the city. The racial makeup of the city was 97.2% White, 0.6% Native American, 0.9% from other races, and 1.3% from two or more races. Hispanic or Latino of any race were 2.0% of the population.

There were 333 households, of which 30.3% had children under the age of 18 living with them, 55.9% were married couples living together, 8.1% had a female householder with no husband present, 4.5% had a male householder with no wife present, and 31.5% were non-families. 29.7% of all households were made up of individuals, and 17.7% had someone living alone who was 65 years of age or older. The average household size was 2.40 and the average family size was 2.91.

The median age in the city was 44.3 years. 25.8% of residents were under the age of 18; 4.9% were between the ages of 18 and 24; 20.7% were from 25 to 44; 27.9% were from 45 to 64; and 20.9% were 65 years of age or older. The gender makeup of the city was 49.5% male and 50.5% female.

2000 census
As of the census of 2000, there were 884 people, 356 households, and 260 families living in the city. The racial makeup of the city was 97.85% White, 0.57% Native American, 0.34% from other races, and 1.24% from two or more races. Hispanic or Latino of any race were 0.68% of the population.

There were 356 households, out of which 31.5% had children under the age of 18 living with them, 62.6% were married couples living together, 7.0% had a female householder with no husband present, and 26.7% were non-families. 23.6% of all households were made up of individuals, and 13.2% had someone living alone who was 65 years of age or older. The average household size was 2.48 and the average family size was 2.94.

Age spread: 25.3% under the age of 18, 5.5% from 18 to 24, 25.6% from 25 to 44, 25.3% from 45 to 64, and 18.2% that were 65 years of age or older. The median age was 39 years. For every 100 females, there were 100.0 males. For every 100 females age 18 and over, there were 101.2 males.

The median income for a household in the city was $41,382, and the median income for a family was $51,806. Males had a median income of $36,118 versus $22,604 for females. The per capita income for the city was $18,202. About 3.2% of families and 5.5% of the population were below the poverty line, including 7.4% of those under age 18 and 7.9% of those age 65 or over.

Education
The Essex Community School District operates local public schools.

Notable people

Leanna Field Driftmier (1886–1976) pioneered the Kitchen-Klatter radio broadcast and magazine from 1926 to 1959.

References

External links

City-Data Comprehensive statistical data and more about Essex

Cities in Iowa
Cities in Page County, Iowa